The St Crispin's Day speech is a part of William Shakespeare's history play Henry V, Act IV Scene iii(3) 18–67. On the eve of the Battle of Agincourt, which fell on Saint Crispin's Day, Henry V urges his men, who were vastly outnumbered by the French, to imagine the glory and immortality that will be theirs if they are victorious. The speech has been famously portrayed by Laurence Olivier to raise British spirits during the Second World War, and by Kenneth Branagh in the 1989 film Henry V; it made famous the phrase "band of brothers". The play was written around 1600, and several later writers have used parts of it in their own texts.

The speech

Cultural influence

Use and quotation

During the Napoleonic Wars, just prior to the Battle of the Nile, Horatio Nelson, 1st Viscount Nelson, then Rear Admiral of the Blue, referred to his captains as his "band of brothers".
Charles Dickens' magazine Household Words (1850-1851) took its name from the speech.
During World War II, Laurence Olivier delivered the speech during a radio programme to boost British morale and Winston Churchill found him so inspiring that he asked Olivier to produce the Shakespeare play as a film. Olivier's adaptation appeared in 1944. It is said that the radio programme inspired Churchill's famous Never was so much owed by so many to so few speech made in 1940 during the Battle of Britain.
The title of British politician Duff Cooper's autobiography Old Men Forget (1953) is taken from the speech.
During the legal battle for the U.S. presidential election of 2000, regarding the Florida vote recount, members of the Florida legal team for George W. Bush, the eventual legal victor, joined arms and recited the speech during a break in preparation, to motivate themselves.
On the day of the result of the 2016 United Kingdom European Union membership referendum, as the vote to leave became clear, activist and MEP Daniel Hannan is reported to have delivered an edited version of the speech from a table, replacing the names Bedford, Exeter, Warwick and Talbot with other prominent Vote Leave activists.

Film, television, music and literature
Parts and/or versions of the speech appear in films such as The Man Who Shot Liberty Valance (1962),  Tombstone (1993), Renaissance Man (1994), Tea With Mussolini (1999), Mystery Men (1999), This Is England (2006), Anonymous (2011), and Their Finest (2017). It has also been used in television series such as Rough Riders (1997),  Buffy the Vampire Slayer, The Black Adder and Doctor Who.
The phrase "band of brothers" appears in the 1789 song "Hail, Columbia", written for the inauguration of George Washington as the first President of the United States.
 During the American Civil War, "The Bonnie Blue Flag"—a 1861 Confederate marching song written by Harry McCarthy—began with the words "We are a band of brothers, and native to the soil".
Stephen Ambrose borrowed the phrase "Band of Brothers" for the title of his 1992 book on E Company of the 101st Airborne during World War II; it was later adapted into the 2001 miniseries Band of Brothers. In the closing scene of the series, Carwood Lipton quotes from Shakespeare's speech.
 The 2016 videogame We Happy Few takes its name from the speech.
A part of the speech is quoted in the 2017 novel The Ministry of Utmost Happiness by Arundhati Roy as one of the character's mother's favourite passage from Shakespeare which is recited (silently) at her second funeral.

References

Citations

General and cited references

External links 
 

16th-century speeches
Cultural depictions of Henry V of England
Fiction set in the 15th century
France in fiction
Hundred Years' War in fiction
Shakespearean histories